The Lawn Tennis Association of Malaysia (LTAM) is the national governing body for tennis in Malaysia.

In March 2014, the Lawn Tennis Association of Malaysia partnered with the Malaysian National Sports Council to open a National Tennis Academy at the National Tennis Centre in Jalan Duta, Kuala Lumpur.

From 2015 to December 2020, the head coach of the national team was Suresh Menon and Development Officer is Zulkhairi Mohd Khir.

Events

Domestic 
LTAM National Junior Tour 2016
 Leg 1 - Kuala Lumpur
 Leg 2 - Selangor
 Leg 3 - Terengganu
 Leg 4 - Kelantan
 Leg 5 - Perlis
 Leg 6 - Sabah
 Leg 7 - Pahang

LTAM National Circuit 2016
 Leg 1 - Kuala Lumpur
 Leg 2 - Pulau Langkawi, Kedah
 Leg 3 - Selangor

1st ITF Terengganu Junior Championship Grade 4 2016

Milo MBPJ Junior Championship 2016

International 
 2016 Davis Cup

References

External links
 LTAM Website

Tennis in Malaysia
Tennis
National members of the Asian Tennis Federation